David Tome is a Solomon Islands politician.

Described as a "former agriculturist turned teacher", he was an independent candidate for the Baegu/Asifola constituency in the August 2010 general election, and finished second of fourteen candidates, with 16.3% of the vote; he was defeated by the incumbent, independent MP Toswel Kaua. Kaua died three months later, and Tome won the resulting by-election in March 2011, with 21.4% of the vote.

On 8 February 2012, Prime Minister Gordon Darcy Lilo appointed him Minister for Provincial Government. (His predecessor, Walter Folatalu, was reshuffled as Minister for Communication and Civil Aviation, replacing Andrew Hanaria who had lost his seat upon being found to have bribed voters.) On 1 March, Tome was reshuffled to the position of Minister for Police, National Security and Correctional Services, left vacant by Clay Forau who had been promoted Minister for Foreign Affairs. On 22 October, Tome was reshuffled to the position of Minister for Agriculture.

References

External links
 David Tome National Parliament of Solomon Islands.

Members of the National Parliament of the Solomon Islands
People from Malaita Province
Government ministers of the Solomon Islands
Living people
Year of birth missing (living people)